The British Composting Association worked to establish an industry standard for composts, the BSI PAS 100 certified by the British Standards Institution. The specification covers the entire process; from raw materials and production methods, through quality control and lab testing ensuring certified composts are quality assured traceable safe and reliable. Description: Composting (waste), Biodegradability, Degradation, Waste disposal, Waste handling, Quality control, Biological hazards, Pathogens, Toxic materials, Toxins, Contaminants, Pollution control, Environmental management, Management operations, Performance, Marking, Labels, Fertilizers.

PAS stands for Publicly Available Specification

See also
Compost
Composting
Home composting
Industrial composting
List of composting systems

References

Biodegradable waste management
Industrial composting
Waste legislation in the United Kingdom
00100
Environmental standards